Francesca Schiavone was the defending champion, but chose not to participate this year.

Victoria Azarenka won the title, defeating Maria Kirilenko in the final 6–3, 6–4.

Seeds
The top two seeds receive a bye into the second round.

Main draw

Finals

Top half

Bottom half

References
 Main Draw
 Qualifying Draw

Kremlin Cup - Kremlin Cup - Women's Singles
Kremlin Cup